Thomas Grant Glenn is a Canadian opera singer.

Education

Glenn grew up playing piano and singing, but turned to voice when he saw others were better at him at piano. He had been leaning toward a career in jazz until he was asked to sing Johann Sebastian Bach’s St. Matthew Passion by Douglas E. Bush, a professor at Brigham Young University.

Glenn holds a Bachelor of Music from Brigham Young University, a Master of Music Performance from University of Michigan with Doctoral Studies at Florida State University (all but dissertation).
He is an alumnus of the Music Academy of the West summer conservatory.

Professional career

Glenn has sung with:

Atlanta Symphony
Berkeley Symphony
China National Symphony Orchestra
The Cleveland Orchestra
Colorado Symphony Orchestra
The English National Opera
Festival Opera
The Lyric Opera of Chicago
Marin Symphony, CA
The Metropolitan Opera
National Arts Centre Orchestra of Canada
Netherlands Opera
New Hampshire Symphony Orchestra
San Francisco Opera
San Francisco Symphony
Santa Rosa Symphony
Seattle Symphony
West Edge Opera, Berkeley, CA

Glenn has received recognitions such as:
Adler Fellowship at San Francisco Opera
Concours International de Chant de Canari, France
2011 Grammy Award, Best Opera Recording as part of the ensemble cast of John Adams's Doctor Atomic (a 2005 recording of the Metropolitan Opera conducted by Alan Gilbert and released by Sony Classical)
semifinalist in the Montserrat Caballé Competition

He has expressed a particular love for the works of Mozart.

While touring, Glenn uses "Skype ... to help the children with their homework and to be with my family for family prayer and family dinner."

External links
thomas-glenn.com

References

Brigham Young University alumni
Canadian Latter Day Saints
Canadian Mormon missionaries
Canadian operatic tenors
Florida State University alumni
Mormon missionaries in France
University of Michigan School of Music, Theatre & Dance alumni
Canadian expatriates in France
Year of birth missing (living people)
Living people
Music Academy of the West alumni